Raja Sri Raya Raghunatha Tondaiman (c. May 1738 – 30 December 1789) was the ruler of Pudukkottai kingdom from 28 December 1769 to 30 December 1789.

Early life 

Raya Raghunatha Tondaiman was born in May 1738 to Vijaya Raghunatha Raya Tondaiman I and his wife Rani Nallakatti Ayi Sahib. He was the only son of the couple and was educated privately.

Reign 

Raya Raghunatha Tondaiman succeeded to the throne on the death of his father on 28 December 1769. His reign was largely uneventful. Raya Raghunatha Tondaiman authored a Telugu work Parvathi Parinyamu.

Raya Raghunatha Tondaiman died on 30 December 1789 after a reign of 20 years. In the absence of a male offspring, Raya Raghunatha Tondaiman was succeeded by his cousin, Vijaya Raghunatha Tondaiman.

Family 

Raya Raghunatha Tondaiman had eleven queens. He had only one offspring - a daughter

 Rajkumari Perumdevi Ammal Ayi Sahib

Notes 

1738 births
1789 deaths
Pudukkottai state
Tamil monarchs